Begonia pearcei is a plant in the begonia family, Begoniaceae. It was introduced to Europe in 1864 by Richard Pearce (after whom it was named) who discovered it in the Bolivian Andes and is important in the hybridising of the Begonia × tuberhybrida begonias, the first of which appeared in 1867.

Description
This begonia is still grown today, and has dark green leaves with a velvety texture and very marked veins. The small, bright yellow flowers add interest, as it is the only yellow among the tuberous species. Its introduction into the breeding programmes led to today's yellow-flowered forms.

The description in Hortus Veitchii reads: The plant is of tufted habit, has the unusual quality of possessing ornamental foliage and showy flowers. The leaves are dark velvety green above, traversed by straw-coloured veins:  the under surface dark red with the exception of a prominent venation. Well above the handsome leaves are borne the bright yellow flowers, usually three in number, on slender scapes.

References

External links

pearcei
Flora of Bolivia
Veitch Nurseries
Taxa named by Joseph Dalton Hooker